Xanthochroina is a genus of false blister beetles in the family Oedemeridae. There are at least three described species in Xanthochroina.

Species
These three species belong to the genus Xanthochroina:
 Xanthochroina auberti (Abeille de Perrin, 1876)
 Xanthochroina bicolor (LeConte, 1851)
 Xanthochroina tarsalis (Kono, 1937)

References

Further reading

 
 

Oedemeridae
Articles created by Qbugbot